Showcase is a comic anthology series published by DC Comics. The general theme of the series was to feature new and minor characters as a way to gauge reader interest in them, without the difficulty and risk of featuring untested characters in their own ongoing titles. Showcase is regarded as the most successful of such tryout series, having been published continuously for more than 14 years, launching numerous popular titles, and maintaining a considerable readership of its own. The series ran from March–April 1956 to September 1970, suspending publication with issue #93, and then was revived for eleven issues from August 1977 to September 1978.

Original series
Showcase featured characters in either one-shot appearances or brief two- or three-issue runs as a way to determine reader interest, without the financial risk of featuring "untested" characters in their own ongoing titles. The series began in March–April 1956 and saw the first appearance of several major characters including the Silver Age Flash, the Challengers of the Unknown, Space Ranger, Adam Strange, Rip Hunter, the Silver Age Green Lantern, the Sea Devils, the Silver Age Atom, the Metal Men, the Inferior Five, the Creeper, Anthro, Hawk and Dove, Angel and the Ape, the Silver Age Spectre, and Bat Lash.

In 1962, DC purchased an adaptation of the James Bond novel and film Dr. No, which had been published in British Classics Illustrated, and published it as an issue of Showcase. It was the first American comic book appearance of the character.

Showcase stood out from other tryout series in that it maintained its own readership; readers who liked a feature would buy the series when it came out, but would often continue buying Showcase as well. The series was canceled in 1970 with issue #93, featuring Manhunter 2070.

Full list of issues

Reprint collections
In 1992, DC Comics published a trade paperback reprint collection titled The Essential Showcase: 1956–1959. This collection reprints selected stories/characters from issues #1, 4, 6, 9, 11, 13, and 17 of the original Showcase series. Several other issues were included in other reprint collections.

Revival
In August 1977, Showcase was revived for 11 issues after the cancellation of 1st Issue Special, which ran from 1975 to 1976. Writer Paul Kupperberg reminisced: "1977 was an expansionary time at DC, and Jenette Kahn was supportive of trying new things. There were a lot of new ideas being thrown around at that time. A lot of books came around, lasted a few issues, and then went away. [DC] decided to create Showcase for the very same reason it was originally created, to have a place to experiment, and if [the feature] sold, great. If not, they were already on to the next idea".[emphasis in original]

The revived Showcase, using the original numbering, began with issue #94 and published the first appearance of the new Doom Patrol and the solo adventures of Power Girl. Issue #100 (May 1978) had a cameo by almost every character that had premiered in the original run of Showcase in a story co-written by Paul Kupperberg and Paul Levitz and drawn by Joe Staton. The series was cancelled again after issue #104 (September 1978), as part of what is commonly called the "DC Implosion". Issues #105 and #106 saw print in Cancelled Comic Cavalcade and #105 was later published in Adventure Comics. Issue #106 was included in The Creeper by Steve Ditko hardcover collection published by DC in 2010. Two other series were announced before the series cancellation: The Huntress, which would have spun out of her feature in Batman Family; and World of Krypton, which was published as DC's first miniseries in 1979. According to editor Paul Levitz, at the time of the cancellation there were still no Huntress stories in production, and the slated content for Showcase #107–109 was Gerry Conway's Western adventure The Deserter.

Full list of issues

Reprint collections

New Talent Showcase
DC published New Talent Showcase, which ran for 15 issues (Jan. 1984 – March 1985), briefly changed its title to Talent Showcase, and then ended with issue #19 (Oct. 1985). For the most part edited by Karen Berger (and for a short time by Sal Amendola), the series gave new writers and artists their first professional opportunity in the comics industry. Notable creators who made their DC debuts with New Talent Showcase include Mark Beachum, Norm Breyfogle, Tom Grindberg, Steve Lightle, Mindy Newell, and Stan Woch. Per editorial policy, the series featured only new characters.

Showcase 1990s
DC revived the Showcase title in 1993 when the 1950s retailer reluctance to order new, untested series had largely vanished, and was replaced in the 1990s with reader enthusiasm for the "#1" issues of new series. The new series was published as Showcase '93, a monthly 12-issue miniseries, replaced yearly by Showcase '94,  '95 and  '96, each one also a miniseries lasting 12 issues. Showcase '96 #12 was the last issue.

Showcase Presents

In 2005, DC began publishing thick, black-and-white reprints of older material under the umbrella title Showcase Presents.

References

External links
 
 
 
 Showcase #55: The Glory of Murphy Anderson

Comics magazines published in the United States
1956 comics debuts
1970 comics endings
1977 comics debuts
1978 comics endings
1984 comics debuts
1985 comics endings
1993 comics debuts
1993 comics endings
1994 comics debuts
1994 comics endings
1995 comics debuts
1995 comics endings
1996 comics debuts
1996 comics endings
Comics by Arnold Drake
Comics by Bob Haney
Comics by Dennis O'Neil
Comics by Gardner Fox
Comics by Jack Kirby
Comics by Paul Kupperberg
Comics by Paul Levitz
Comics by Peter J. Tomasi
Comics by Robert Kanigher
Comics by Steve Ditko
DC Comics limited series
DC Comics titles
Defunct American comics
Magazines established in 1956
Magazines disestablished in 1970
Magazines established in 1977
Magazines disestablished in 1978
Magazines established in 1984
Magazines disestablished in 1985
Magazines established in 1993
Magazines disestablished in 1993
Magazines established in 1994
Magazines disestablished in 1994
Magazines established in 1995
Magazines disestablished in 1995
Magazines established in 1996
Magazines disestablished in 1996
Superhero comics